Naudet is a surname, and may refer to:

 Joseph Naudet, French historian
 Thomas Charles Naudet, 1773–1810, French artist/historical artist.
 Françoise Naudet, 1928-, French sculptor
 Franck Naudet, 1969-, French poet
 Jules and Gédéon Naudet, French filmmakers